Santiago Cortés may refer to:\

Santiago Cortés (botanist) (1854–1924), see Elaeis
Santiago Cortés (footballer)
Santiago Cortés (musician)